The 9th Legislative Assembly of Ontario was in session from March 1, 1898, until April 19, 1902, just prior to the 1902 general election. The majority party was the Ontario Liberal Party  led by Arthur Sturgis Hardy. George William Ross became the Liberal leader when Hardy retired in 1899.

François-Eugène-Alfred Évanturel served as speaker for the assembly.

Members elected to the Assembly

Timeline

External links 
A History of Ontario : its resources and development., Alexander Fraser
Members in Parliament 9

References 

1898 establishments in Ontario
1902 disestablishments in Ontario
09